Toscana-Terra di Ciclismo is a cycling race held annually in Italy. It was part of UCI Europe Tour, as a category 2.ncup race, in 2011 and 2012, meaning it was part of the UCI Under 23 Nations' Cup After a four-year hiatus, the race was organised again in 2017, as a 2.2U race, again restricting to competitors under the age of 23.

Winners

References

Cycle races in Italy
UCI Europe Tour races
Recurring sporting events established in 2011
2011 establishments in Italy